Sir Henry Edgar Paston-Bedingfeld, 10th Baronet (born 7 December 1943) is a British baronet and retired officer of arms.

Family and career
Paston-Bedingfeld is the only son of Sir Edmund Paston-Bedingfeld, 9th Baronet of Oxburgh Hall, Norfolk, by his wife Joan Lynette Rees. He succeeded to the family title upon his father's death on 24 May 2011. He was educated at Ampleforth College, then an all-boys private school in Ampleforth, Yorkshire.

Paston-Bedingfeld served as Norroy and Ulster King of Arms, the junior of the two provincial Kings-at-Arms with jurisdiction over the north of England and Northern Ireland, between 2010 and 2014. He had previously been York Herald since 1993 and prior to that Rouge Croix Pursuivant from 1983.

He is an Honorary Vice-president of the Cambridge University Heraldic and Genealogical Society and of the Norfolk Record Society; Sir Henry is a liveryman of the Bowyers' Company and served as Master of the Scriveners' Company for 2012–13.

He married, in 1968, Mary Kathleen daughter of Brigadier Robert Ambrose CIE OBE MC. Sir Henry and Lady Paston-Bedingfeld have two sons and two daughters; their elder son, Richard (born 1975) is heir apparent to the baronetcy.

Selected heraldic designs by Paston-Bedingfeld
Derby School
Institute of Traffic Accident Inspectors
Royal Society of St George

Honours
  – Baronet
  – Knight of Malta

Arms

See also
Heraldry
College of Arms
Paston-Bedingfeld baronets

References

External links 
 Biography on Debrett's People of Today website
 Standing Council of the Baronetage website
 www.scriveners.org.uk

1943 births
Living people
People from Breckland District
People educated at Ampleforth College
British genealogists
English officers of arms
Knights of Malta
Baronets in the Baronetage of England